Sotiris Mavrodimos (born 18 July 1962) is a Greek former professional footballer who played as a defender and a former manager.

Club career
Mavrodimos played in Aiani and Kozani before he was transferred to AEK Athens in the summer of 1986. He played in the defensive positions but also as a defensive midfielder. In 10 February 1988 he scored against Olympiacos equalizing the game in a 1–3 home defeat for the Greek Cup. On 1 March 1987 in a match against Apollon Athens after an unsportsmanlike mark by Alexis Fabiatos, Mavrodimos lost consciousness for a few minutes, as according to the doctors for a few seconds his vital signs didn't even work, shocking football fans all over Greece. The efforts of the team's physiotherapist Nikos Pantazis and his teammate Stelios Manolas played a decisive role in keeping him alive at that moment. Finally, he was later transferred to the KAT Hospital and fully recovered, avoiding the fatal accident. Mavrodimos didn't even accept the visit of Fabiatos to the hospital to apologize to him, since he considered his hit intentional. He was present in big European nights against Internazionale and Athletic Bilbao He left AEK in December 1988, playing for Olympiacos Volos and Niki Volos before ending his career.

After football
After the end of his career Mavrodimos was involved in coaching having short spells at Kozani and Pyrsos Grevena.

References

1962 births
Living people
Greek footballers
Kozani F.C. players
AEK Athens F.C. players
Olympiacos Volos F.C. players
Niki Volos F.C. players
Kozani F.C. managers
Association football defenders
People from Kozani (regional unit)